Egegik ( Sugpiaq: Igya'iq, Igyagiq) is a city in Lake and Peninsula Borough, Alaska, United States. As of the 2020 census, the population of the city is 39, down from 109 in 2010. It has been home to cannery operations. If the city's population somehow exploded in the decades to come, it will potentially become the new borough seat of Lake and Peninsula Borough replacing King Salmon.

Geography

Egegik is at  (58.219292, -157.357989) on the eastern shores of both Bristol Bay and, more locally, of Egegik Bay. The village is on a high bluff along the southern shore of the Egegik River at the upper extent of Egegik Bay.

Demographics

Egegik first appeared on the 1880 U.S. Census as the unincorporated Inuit village of Igagik. It appeared again under that name in 1890 and 1900. It returned again in 1920 as Egegik.

As of the census of 2000, there were 64 people, 44 households, and 2 1/2 families residing in the city. The population density was 3.5 people per square mile (1.4/km2). There were 286 housing units at an average density of 8.7 per square mile (3.4/km2). The racial makeup of the city was 18.97% White, 57.76% Native American, 0.86% Asian, and 22.41% from two or more races. 6.90% of the population were Hispanic or Latino of any race.

There were 44 households, out of which 29.5% had children under the age of 18 living with them, 36.4% were married couples living together, 2.3% had a female householder with no husband present, and 47.7% were non-families. 36.4% of all households were made up of individuals, and none had someone living alone who was 65 years of age or older. The average household size was 2.64 and the average family size was 3.74.

In the city, the age distribution of the population shows 32.8% under the age of 18, 7.8% from 18 to 24, 35.3% from 25 to 44, 20.7% from 45 to 64, and 3.4% who were 65 years of age or older. The median age was 35 years. For every 100 females, there were 146.8 males. For every 100 females age 18 and over, there were 116.7 males.

The median income for a household in the city was $46,000, and the median income for a family was $59,583. Males had a median income of $39,375 versus $40,000 for females. The per capita income for the city was $16,352. There were no families and 6.9% of the population living below the poverty line, including no under eighteens and none of those over 64.

References

Cities in Alaska
Cities in Lake and Peninsula Borough, Alaska
Populated coastal places in Alaska on the Pacific Ocean